The TCNJ Lions are the athletic teams representing The College of New Jersey (TCNJ). They are a member of the New Jersey Athletic Conference (NJAC) and compete within Division III of the National Collegiate Athletic Association (NCAA).

Overview 
The school fields 11 varsity sports teams for men and women each and has captured 44 team national championships, as well as more than 40 individual and relay national championships, across multiple programs. The school's two most successful are the Women's Lacrosse team with 12 NCAA Division III Championships and the Women's Field Hockey team with 11 Division III NCAA Championships, the most of any team in D-III for either sport.

The wrestling team hosts has placed in the top 20 nationally for 30 consecutive years, including 5 national championships (1979, 1981, 1984, 1985, 1987), 5 runner-up finishes, and numerous finishes in the top 5.

TCNJ's varsity teams are the top combined first- and second-place finishers of all 424 Division III schools in the nation over more than 25 years.

In 1957, TCNJ, then known as Trenton State College, was a founding member of the NJAC (then called the New Jersey State Athletic Conference) along with five other state institutions. Since then, and after the conference allowed women's sports in 1985, the school has been a powerhouse winning the most titles in men's cross country, women's cross country, field hockey, women's tennis, women's soccer.

The track and field teams have especially dominated the NJAC since the title was first contested in 1997, winning each year in both indoor and outdoor.

In 2017–18, TCNJ captured its first NJAC cup, after claiming titles in women’s cross country, field hockey, women’s tennis, women’s indoor track & field, and women’s lacrosse, and NJAC regular season titles in softball and baseball.

Outside of varsity athletics the school also hosts 15 club sports including a men's ice hockey team that competes within the American Collegiate Hockey Association (ACHA) at Division I. The team is a member of the Northeast Collegiate Hockey League. Prior to 2022, the team competed in ACHA Division II and won championships in various conferences such as the Great Northeast Collegiate Hockey Conference (2012, 2014) and the Colonial States College Hockey Conference (2017, 2018, 2019, 2020).

Men's athletics 
Baseball
Basketball
Cross Country
Football
Soccer
Swimming & Diving
Tennis
Indoor and Outdoor Track & Field – considered two separate sports by the NCAA
Wrestling

Women's athletics 
Basketball
Cross Country
Field Hockey
Lacrosse
Soccer
Softball
Swimming & Diving
Tennis
Indoor and Outdoor Track & Field – considered two separate sports by the NCAA

Club sports 
Baseball
Basketball (women)
Bowling
CrewCheerleading
Ice hockey
Lacrosse (men and women)
Rugby (men and women)
Soccer (men and women)
Softball
Swimming
Tennis
Ultimate frisbee
Unified sports (Special Olympics and TCNJ students)
Volleyball (men and women)

Championships 

*The NCAA vacated the 1992 Women's Lacrosse title due to use of an ineligible player during the tournament

Source

List of individual TCNJ national champions 

Source

References

 
Sports teams in the New York metropolitan area